Abdelali Gluja Mhamdi  (born 29 November 1991) is a Moroccan professional footballer who plays as a goalkeeper.

Honours

Club 

Nahdat Berkane
Morocco Throne Cup: 2018

International 
Morocco
African Nations Championship: 2018

References 

Living people
1991 births
Moroccan footballers
Moroccan expatriate footballers
Morocco international footballers
Sportspeople from Marrakesh
Association football goalkeepers
Kawkab Marrakech players
RS Berkane players
Abha Club players
Botola players
Saudi Professional League players
Expatriate footballers in Saudi Arabia
Moroccan expatriate sportspeople in Saudi Arabia
Morocco A' international footballers
2016 African Nations Championship players
2018 African Nations Championship players